= Renato Rivera =

Mexican footballer (born 1985)

Renato Anselmo Rivera Rico (born June 17, 1985 in Guadalajara) is a former professional Mexican footballer.
